Bikram Keshari Arukha is an Indian politician and Member of Odisha Legislative Assembly from Bhanjanagar Assembly constituency who is serving as Speaker of Odisha Legislative Assembly. He is continuously six time MLA from Bhanjanagar Assembly constituency.

Personal life 
He was born on 28 September 1962 in Ganjam.

References 

1962 births
Odisha MLAs 1995–2000
Odisha MLAs 2000–2004
Odisha MLAs 2004–2009
Odisha MLAs 2009–2014
Odisha MLAs 2014–2019
Odisha MLAs 2019–2024
People from Ganjam district
Speakers of the Odisha Legislative Assembly
Biju Janata Dal politicians
Living people